Bilgram or Bhil gram is a town and a nagar palika parishad in Hardoi district in the state of Uttar Pradesh, India. Important industries in Bilgram include ceramics and embroidery.

As of 2011, Bilgram's population is 29,768, in 4,717 households. It serves as the headquarters of a tehsil and a community development block.

Geography
The river Ganga is located between Bilgram and Kannauj.

Climate 
Summers are hot and humid while winters are cold with minor rainfall.

Culture 
Culture of town belongs to the Awadh region. Many people migrated from town after partition of the country. People from Bilgram usually used Bilgrami as title name. Many Bilgrami famous persons are belonged to this town.

History
According to tradition, Bilgram was founded in the 9th or 10th century by the Raikwar king Raja Sri Ram. He conquered the place from the Thatheras, named it "Srinagar" after himself, and built the fort, temple, and the Sagar tank. The Raikwars then ruled the area until the Muslim conquest, but when or how that happened is unclear.
Srinagar was then renamed by the Muslim conquerors Bilgram after a legendary demon Bil. From here the Delhi Sultanate went on to control and dominate Oudh in 1217 under Iltutmish Shams ad-Din ibn al-Kutbi Yalam Khan (1210/1211–1236).

The two officers who conquered the region and Srinagar were the ancestors of talukdars Bilgram existed at least until the end of the 19th century. After it was made capital of a Pargana in the time of Akbar the Great, which was then ruled by Sayyid in 1000 but served with soldiers and included neighbouring Pargana Bang. A local saint killed a demon called Bel and took the name derived Belgram to Bilgram.

In 1881 the town had 11,067 inhabitants. The ancient name of Bilgram is Srinagar, its present name Bilgram was given by some associates of Mahmood Gajnavi. The Battle of Bilgram in 1540 took place between Humayun and Sher Shah Suri. Sher Shah Suri defeated Humayun in the Battle of Bilgram.

The Sadaat Bilgram are a group of Sayyid families who inhabit the historic town of Bilgram in Hardoi District. Saadat-e-Bilgram literally means the Sayyid of the town of Bilgram. These Hussaini Sayyids first migrated from Wasit, Iraq in the 13th century. Their ancestor, Syed Mohammad Sughra, a Zaidi Sayyid of Iraq, arrived in India during the rule of Sultan Iltutmish.

In 1217-18 the family conquered and settled in Bilgram. The Sayyid commanded a Muslim army that overcame the Bhars, who were the traditional rulers of the Hardoi region, and was granted an estate centred on the town of Bilgram, where the Sayyid settled down. died in 1247, his tomb was constructed by Syed Mohammad Muhsin son of Syed Mohammad Said in 1738–39.

Sixth in descent from Syed Mohammad Sughra was Syed Abdul Farah of Wasit (from him are descendants of most renowned Sayyid families in Northern India, the Barhah and Bilgram Sayyids; and in Khairabad, Fatehpur Haswa and at many other places branches of the same stem are found.), who was the ancestor of the Saadat-e-Bara, another community of Sayyids.

The Bilgrami Sayyid were important power brokers in the southern part of Awadh, and remained an important and influential clan, throughout the Middle Ages. They provided several taluqdar families and were substantial landowners.

The Bilgrami Sayyids benefitted from the patronage of the Grand Vizier Munim Khan II, who was known for his support of Indian Sayyids and Shaikhzadas. When Ruh-ul-Amin Khan of Bilgram reportedly entered state service with only 60 horsemen and foot soldiers, the Munim Khan II created him a mansab of 6000 and made him his close associate.

Among the most notable persons of the Bilgram are Allama Azad Bilgrami (1704-1786), Syed Ali Bilgrami(1851-1911), Imad-ul-Mulk Bahadur Syed Hussain Bilgrami(1842-1926), Sursuba of Malwa and Isagarh estate Khan Bhadur Syed Ali Bahadur Bilgrami.

At present time Maulana Abid Bilgrami(India) & Maulana Alay Ahmad Bilgrami(Pakistan) are internationally known names in the field of Islamic studies. There are many civil servants belongs to Bilgram of whom SAT Rizvi, Kamran Rizvi and Dr Mohd Iliyaas Rizvi are some of the important names. Unfortunately, Bilgram has lost the sheen that it once had in the field of scholarship. In this regard famous Urdu poet of Bilgram Huzoor Bilgrami says:

Ab to talchhat zeenat-e-jaam-o-suraahi hai 'huzoor'

Rashk-e-maikhana kabhi tha bilgram apni jagah.

loosely translated as (Now only sediment remained for the pitcher,
once bilgram was the envy of the people of tastes)

Bilgram is located on the Billahaur-Katra State Highway
Distance from Kannauj-29 km
Distance from Hardoi-27 km
Distance from Kanpur - 110 km
Distance from Lucknow - 110 km
Distance From Farrukhabad - 70 km

Around the turn of the 20th century, Bilgram was described as a large town with thriving commerce and several historical monuments. At the time, Bilgram served as a tehsil and pargana headquarters, and it had a munsifi, police station, dispensary, post office, inspection bungalow, and cattle pound, as well as an upper primary school that lay on a site previously occupied by the town's fort. There was also a military encampment on the north side of town.

At that time, Bilgram was a moderately important trading hub, with Hardoi and Madhoganj being its main trading partners. There were several markets in town, including the two old ones called the bari and chhoti bazaars that had been built by the Nazim Hakim Mehndi Ali Khan. To the south of the town lay the Rafaiyatganj market, also built by him, but by that point it had declined significantly. The main reason for its decline was the construction of two new bazaars in town: one by Sarju Parshad, which hosted markets on Sundays and Wednesdays, and the other by Wasi Haidar, taluqdar of Bhogetapur, which held them on Mondays and Thursdays.

Although Bilgram was not a major industrial centre at the time, it was noted for producing "lac-glazed pottery of pleasing design, especially in the shape of amritbans and gharras", which were variously painted green or yellow, or decorated with silver leaf. Other manufactured goods produced in Bilgram included carved doors and lintels, various wooden items (especially sandals), leather shoes, brass inkstands, and paan boxes.

Demographics

 India census, Bilgram had a population of 25,292. Males constitute 54% of the population and females 46%. Bilgram has an average literacy rate of 50%, lower than the national average of 59.5%; with male literacy of 57% and female literacy of 42%. 18% of the population was under 6 years of age.

Schools and Colleges
Girls Degree College
BGRM Inter College
Baba Manshanath Inter College
Government Girls Inter College
Shri Darshan Singh Inter College, Pasner
Shri Chhattar Singh Inter College
SD Public School
City Public School

Economy
As of 1971, the economy of Bilgram was described as dominated by primary activities. The main items imported were cloth, sugar, and cotton. The main items manufactured were shoes, handloom cloth, and beedies. The biggest exports were grains, vegetables, and tobacco.

Festivals 

Moharram is one of the most important festivals of Bilgram since the medieval period.  Although after the partition of India most of the families have either migrated to Pakistan or the other Indian Cities like Lucknow, Delhi, Rampur, Hyderabad etc., the sheen of the Moharram commemoration did not come to an end and Bilgramis commemorate it for two months and eight days. One of the important contributions of Moharram is that during this period Sayyid families return to Bilgram from every nook and corner of India to pay homage to the supreme scarifies of Imam Hussain. Important dates of Moharram Commemorations are  6th, 7th, 8th, 9th Moharram's Famous Juloos is called Club Ka Matam, which is the largest juloos in bilgram at Syyedwada and 10th of Moharram is famous for its Bada Taziya, which is lifted by 32 men (this tazia is world famous), beside these dates 16 Safar, Chehllum, Bahattar Tabut and Chup Tazia, Ayyame Fatima(s.a.) are very famous functions where hundreds of people congregate to pay homage to the martyrs of Karbala Anjuman Azae Hussain Organizes 72 Taboot Whereas Anjuman Bazme Hussainiya Qadeem organizes Shabbedari and chup tazia juloos. There are three Anjumans (communities) i.e., Anjuman Bazm-e- Hussainiya Qadeem, Bazm-e- Azaay-e-Hussain and Gulzar-e-Hussaini beside this there is a committee named Youth Of Bazm-e-Hussainiya Which Promotes Azadari Of Imam Hussain Ibn Ali in Bilgram they all supervise and organised several programs. Besides Moharram, Eid ul Fitr, Eid ul Azha, Wiladate Maula Ali, Dastarkhuan, and Shabberaat is also celebrated with zeal.

Sunni Muslims also celebrate a plethora of urs on various occasions. Urs e paak of "Meer Abdul Wahid sahab Bilgrami" celebrates every year by the Wasti family and Mureedin at his shrine.

Famous sites 
Bada Imam Bada Bilgram and Dargah Abbas is almost 300 years old holy sites of Shia Muslims and heritage place for visitors.

Baba Manshanath Temple is the oldest temple in town.
It is the center of the main faith of the Hindu people.
It has its own importance in the month of Savan. It hosts the fair in this month.
Devotees come from far and wide for the worship of Lord Shankar.
This temple was built by Lala Mansaram.

Villages 
Bilgram CD block has the following 120 villages:

See also 

 Bilgrami
 Akeel Bilgrami
 Azad Bilgrami
 Hyder Bilgrami
 Syed Hussain Bilgrami
 Syeda Bilgrami Imam

References

 
Cities and towns in Hardoi district